Tomasz Bednarek and Mateusz Kowalczyk were the defending champions but decided not to participate.
Blaž Kavčič and Antonio Veić won the title after defeating Javier Martí and Leonardo Tavares 6–3, 6–3 in the final.

Seeds

Draw

Draw

References
 Main Draw

Cyclus Open de Tenis - Doubles
2012 Doubles
Cyc